The Winona State Warriors are the athletic teams of Winona State University, located in Winona, Minnesota.  They compete in the National Collegiate Athletic Association, Division II for all sports except for women's gymnastics, which competes in the National Collegiate Gymnastics Association.

There are 14 teams (9 women's, 5 men's) representing Winona State University on the varsity level.  All varsity sports compete in the Northern Sun Intercollegiate Conference, with the exception of the women's gymnastics team which competes in the Wisconsin Intercollegiate Athletic Conference.

Athletics
Winona State fields 14 teams.

Men's
 Baseball
 Basketball
 Cross Country
 Football
 Golf

Women's
 Basketball
 Cross Country
 Golf
 Gymnastics
 Soccer
 Softball
 Tennis
 Track and field (Indoor and Outdoor)
 Volleyball

Men's Basketball
The Warriors have won 2 National Championships (2006 and 2008), 5 NSIC Tournament Championships (2001, 06, 07, 08, 11), 14 NSIC Regular Season Championships, 9 NCAA Division II Tournament Appearances and 4 NAIA Division I Tournament Appearances In the 2007–08 season, the Warriors won 38 games, which stands as an NCAA record for wins in a single season, tied with the Kentucky Wildcats. Over the course of two seasons, the Warriors won an NCAA Division II record 57 consecutive games.

Football
The Winona State Warriors are coached by alum Tom Sawyer.  The team plays at Altra Federal Credit Union Stadium.  The Warriors have won 18 NSIC titles, most recently in 2011.  The Warriors added a south division title in 2010 when NSIC split into divisions.  They have made six NCAA postseason appearances (2001, 2003, 2004, 2006, 2007, 2017), as well as one NAIA postseason appearance in 1993. In addition, the Warriors have played in four Mineral Water Bowls (2000, 2002, 2012, 2019).

Soccer
Women's Soccer has been a sponsored sport at Winona State since the 1995 season.  They are coached by Ali Omar. As of the end of the 2013 season, the Warriors all-time record is 272–88–23. Ali Omar has been the only head coach in the team's history. The Warriors made the NCAA playoffs four times (2001, 2007, 2008, 2010 and 2013). The Warriors have won 11 conference titles, most recently in 2011. Winona State has posted a losing record only once, the 1995 campaign when they went 1–7.

Baseball
Winona State baseball has been coached by Kyle Poock, who has led the team since 2003. The Warriors have made the NCAA tournament six times (1998, 2000, 2007, 2010, 2011 2012) and the NAIA tournament 21 times. WSU has made it to the NAIA World Series six times, most recently in 1992.  Winona State has made it to one NCAA World Series, coming in 2011 when they finished as runner-up.  The Warriors have only had one losing season since 1947, coming the 1982 season.

Former head coach Gary Grob won 1,020 games in his career, making him one of nine coaches in NCAA Division II history to have achieved the mark (as of the 2013 season). Grob coached Winona State from 1967 to 1974, then again from 1976 to 2002.

Softball
Winona State softball is led by Greg Jones, who has coached the Warriors since the 2001 season. The Warriors have made the NCAA tournament ten times, most recently in 2014. The Warriors have appeared in two Women's College World Series, in 1974 (no divisions) and 2009.

Championships
Winona State University has enjoyed a varied level of success since the first fielding athletic teams in the late 1800s. Several teams have captured conference, regional and national honors.

NCAA Regional titles
Men's Golf – 3 (1993, 1994, 2006)
Men's Basketball – 4 (2006, 2007, 2008, 2013)
Women's Softball – 1 (2009)
Men's Baseball – 1 (2011)

NCAA Runner-up
Men's Basketball –1 (2007)
Men's Baseball –1 (2011)

NCAA National titles
Men's Basketball – 2 (2006, 2008)

NAIA National titles
Women's Gymnastics – 2 (1985, 1987)

Facilities
Maxwell Field at Warrior Stadium is the home the men's football and women's soccer teams. McCown Gym is home to men's and women's basketball teams, as well as the women's volleyball and women's gymnastics teams. Home tennis match are played at the SMU Tennis Center, near WSU's west campus. Baseball games are played at Loughrey Field. Softball games are played at Alumni Field.

References

External links